is a Nintendo brand used for the Nintendo DS and Wii showing games created to appeal to a broader audience (mainly adults and the elderly) than the traditional gamer. Nintendo retired the brand with the launch of the Nintendo 3DS in 2011, six years after its introduction. Regardless for this, some games that were introduced under the brand continue to receive follow-up entries on the contemporary and future Nintendo consoles.

Games

Big Brain Academy and Magnetica, games for the Nintendo DS, became the first games in North America to have the designation for the Touch! Generations brand, being released on June 5, 2006, followed up by Sudoku Gridmaster on June 26 of that year. In addition to that, several previously released games were labeled under the Touch! Generations brand. The games for Touch! Generations vary between different countries.

In Japan, the origin of the Touch! Generations line-up, the brand has massive success, especially with the Brain Training games ranking high in game sales. A soundtrack also exists with music from some of the games. It was released on October 14, 2008 and could be obtained only from Club Nintendo for 400 coins.

In North America, Brain Age: Train Your Brain in Minutes a Day! was released on April 16, 2006 in the United States and in Canada on April 17 of that year; however, the Touch! Generations brand was not launched until June 5, 2006.

The Touch! Generations brand was released in Europe on June 9, 2006 with the release of Dr. Kawashima's Brain Training: How Old Is Your Brain? (known in North America as Brain Age: Train Your Brain in Minutes a Day!).

Reception
The Touch! Generations games have been received well. The Nintendogs series is one of the most popular DS software titles, selling 23.96 million units as of May 2009, followed by Brain Age at 19.01 million units and Brain Age 2: More Training in Minutes a Day! around nearly 15 million units as of September 2015.

Notes

References

External links
 Touch! Generations official website
 Touch! Generations Official Japanese website 

 
Nintendo franchises
Nintendo